Michael Johnson (born May 9, 1984) is a former American football safety. He was drafted by the New York Giants in the seventh round of the 2007 NFL Draft and has also played for the Detroit Lions. He played college football at the University of Arizona.

College career
Johnson played in 21 games with 14 starts at Arizona after transferring from Tyler Junior College. Was credited with 107 tackles (75 solo) and had 5 interceptions, 5.5 tackles for losses, a forced fumble and 2 fumble recoveries. In 2006, started all 10 games in which he played at strong safety, he earned All-Pac-10 2nd-team honors and finished 5th on the team with 47 tackles (35 solo), including 1 stop for a 7-yard loss. He caused and recovered 1 fumble, deflected 4 passes and intercepted another.

Professional career

New York Giants
He was a seventh round (224th pick overall) draft choice by the Giants in 2007, and wore jersey number 43. Johnson joined Aaron Ross, Steve Smith, Jay Alford, Zak DeOssie, Kevin Boss, Adam Koets, and Ahmad Bradshaw as 2007 Giants draft choices who contributed in their rookie season for the Giants Super Bowl XLII win. In the NFC Championship that season against the Green Bay Packers, Johnson made a critically important play late in the 4th quarter: Fellow Giant R. W. McQuarters fumbled a punt return, and as Packer Jarrett Bush wrapped his hands around the ball to recover it, Johnson dove in and punched the ball out of Bush's hands.  The fumble was eventually recovered by fellow Giant Domenik Hixon, and they went on to win the game in overtime.
   
In 2008, Johnson switched to number 20. Originally sought to be a temporary holder of the free safety position until first rounder Kenny Phillips was ready, Johnson held on to a starting spot all season, playing games at both free safety and strong safety.  He finishing the regular season second on the team with 88 total tackles and two interceptions.

He became an unrestricted free agent following the 2010 season, picked up by the Detroit Lions.

Detroit Lions
On August 10, 2011, Johnson signed with the Detroit Lions.  He was released on August 29, 2011.

Personal life
Born in Austin, Texas, Johnson attended Pflugerville High School. He is the younger brother of former Detroit Lions linebacker Reggie Brown.

References

1984 births
Living people
Players of American football from Austin, Texas
African-American players of American football
American football safeties
Arizona Wildcats football players
New York Giants players
Detroit Lions players
Tyler Apaches football players
21st-century African-American sportspeople
20th-century African-American people